Liparetrini is a tribe of scarab beetles in the family Scarabaeidae.

Taxonomy
Liparetrini contains the following genera:
 Leonotus
 Colpochila
 Prodontria
 Blepharotoma
 Costelytra
 Allophylus
 Odontria
 Scythrodes
 Heteronyx
 Sericospilus
 Scitaloides
 Liparetrus
 Telura

References

Liparetrini
Beetle tribes